The Best American Short Stories 1992 is a volume in The Best American Short Stories series edited by Robert Stone.

Short stories included

References

External links

 Best American Short Stories

1992 anthologies
Fiction anthologies
Short Stories 1992
Houghton Mifflin books